The 2013–14 Australian Women's Twenty20 Cup was the fifth formal season of the Australian Women's Twenty20 Cup, which was the premier domestic women's Twenty20 cricket competition in Australia prior to the inception of the Women's Big Bash League in 2015. The tournament started on 11 October 2013 and finished on 7 February 2014. For the first and only time, the tournament included semi-finals. Defending champions New South Wales Breakers went unbeaten in the group stage but lost to ACT Meteors in the semi-finals. Queensland Fire won the tournament for the first time after finishing third in the group stage and beating ACT Meteors in the final.

Ladder

Fixtures

Semi-finals

Final

Statistics

Highest totals

Most runs

Most wickets

References

External links
 Series home at ESPNcricinfo

 
Australian Women's Twenty20 Cup seasons
 
Australian Women's Twenty20 Cup